Scaevola or Scævola (Latin for "left-handed") may refer to:
 Gaius Mucius Scaevola, a legendary assassin said to have burnt his right hand away as a show of determination during the early years of the Roman Republic
 Muciii Scaevolae, a family in the Roman Republic

 Scaevola, a 1958 nuclear test undertaken by the United States as part of Operation Hardtack I

 Scaevola (plant), the genus of fan-flowers
 Scaevola (gastropod), a genus of extinct gastropods